Power Book IV: Force is an American crime drama television series created by Robert Munic that premiered on February 6, 2022, on Starz. The series is a sequel and third spin-off to Power created by Courtney A. Kemp. In March 2022, the series was renewed for a second season.

Cast

Main

 Joseph Sikora as Tommy Egan 
 Isaac Keys as David "Diamond" Sampson
 Lili Simmons as Claudia "Claud" Flynn
 Gabrielle Ryan as Gloria (season 1)
 Shane Harper as Victor "Vic" Flynn
 Kris D. Lofton as Jenard Sampson
 Anthony Fleming as JP Gibbs
 Lucien Cambric as Darnell "D-Mac" McDowell
 Tommy Flanagan as Walter Flynn
 Miriam A. Hyman as Stacy Marks (season 2, guest season 1)
 Adrienne Walker as Shanti 'Showstopper' Page (season 2)
 Carmela Zumbado as Mireya Garcia (season 2)

Supporting

 Audrey Esparza as Liliana (season 1)
 Jeremih as Elijah (season 1)
 Chanell Bell as Lauryn Williams
 Konstantin Lavysh as Rodovan Mirkovic
 Guy Van Swearingen as Paulie "Pierogi" Muzaski
 Ahmad Nicholas Ferguson as Marshall Cranon
 Phil Donlon as Simon McDougal (season 1)
 Debo Balogun as Seamus Bennigan
 Barton Fitzpatrick as Blaxton (season 1)
 Mirelly Taylor as Mrs. Soto
 Paulina Nguyen as Mai Liet (season 1)
 Blythe Howard as Adrienne
 Patricia Kalember as Kate Egan
 Monique Gabriela Curnen as Detective Blanca Rodriguez

Episodes

Production
In August 2020, it was announced that the series had been given a greenlight with a 10-episode series order to focus on Joseph Sikora’s character of Tommy Egan. At that time Robert Munic was announced to serve as showrunner on the series and executive produce with Courtney A. Kemp and Curtis “50 Cent” Jackson. In February 2021, eight additional cast members were added as series regulars:  Lili Simmons, Gabrielle Ryan, Isaac Keys, Shane Harper, Kris D. Lofton, Anthony Fleming III, Lucien Cambric and Tommy Flanagan. In May 2021, it was announced that Jeremih would be joining the cast in a recurring role.  In July 2021, it was announced that Robert Munic was leaving as showrunner, citing creative differences. Courtney A. Kemp, who oversees all the Power series, would be taking over. On March 9, 2022, Starz renewed the series for a second season with Gary Lennon taking over as the new showrunner, Munic having exited.

Ratings

References

External links
 
 
 
 

2020s American black television series
2022 American television series debuts
2020s American crime drama television series
Television series by G-Unit Films and Television Inc.
English-language television shows
Serial drama television series
Starz original programming
Television series by CBS Studios
Television series by Lionsgate Television
Television shows filmed in New York (state)
Television shows set in New York City
Television series about organized crime
Works about African-American organized crime
Works about Mexican drug cartels
Works about the Serbian Mafia